John Hedigan (born 14 October 1948) is a retired Irish judge who has served on the Court of Appeal (2016–18), High Court (2007-14) and the European Court of Human Rights (1998-2007). He is the current chair of the Irish Banking Culture Board (IBCB).

Early career 
Hedigan was educated at Belvedere College, Trinity College Dublin and King's Inns. He was called to the Irish Bar in November 1976. He became a Senior Counsel in 1990.

He became a Bencher of the King's Inns in 2002. He was called to the English Bar in 1986 and to the Bar of New South Wales Australia in 1993.

Judicial career 
Hedigan chaired the Civil Service Disciplinary Appeals Tribunal from 1992 to 1994. Hedigan was appointed as a judge of the European Court of Human Rights in November 1998 and served until April 2007. He was subsequently appointed as a judge of the High Court in 2007, and served until his elevation to the new Court of Appeal on its creation in 2016.

He retired from the Court of Appeal in October 2018.<ref>

References

Living people
Judges of the Court of Appeal (Ireland)
High Court judges (Ireland)
Alumni of Trinity College Dublin
People educated at Belvedere College
1954 births
21st-century Irish judges
20th-century Irish lawyers
Alumni of King's Inns